Alfa Romeo P1 or Alfa Romeo Tipo P1 was the first Grand Prix car made by Alfa Romeo in 1923. The car had a 2.0 L straight-6 engine and it produced  at 5000 rpms. Three cars were entered in the Italian GP at Monza in 1923, for Antonio Ascari, Giuseppe Campari  and Ugo Sivocci. When Sivocci was practicing for the GP in September 1923 he crashed and was killed.  Alfa Romeo withdrew from the competition and development of the car was stopped. In 1924 a new version with Roots-compressor was made and became the P1 Compressore 1924.

In 1923 Vittorio Jano was hired to Alfa Romeo to design new car and P2 was born.

Notes

References

Grand Prix cars
P1